Elsham Priory was an Augustinian monastery in Lincolnshire, England. The only surviving trace is a fishpond in the grounds of Elsham Hall. Beatrice d'Amundeville founded the monastery in the 12th century it was dissolved in 1536.

References

Monasteries in Lincolnshire